The Santa Fe Chamber Music Festival is a six-week-long summer Festival of chamber music held annually in July and August and located in Santa Fe, New Mexico.  It was founded in 1972 and presented its first series of concerts in 1973. Well-known musicians and young performers appear each season in concerts presented in the St. Francis Auditorium and the restored Lensic Theater.

In its inaugural year Pablo Casals acted as honorary president. The Festival has contributed to the contemporary chamber music repertoire by commissioning 38 pieces from well-known composers, including Aaron Copland, Ned Rorem, Ellen Taaffe Zwilich, and John Harbison.  The festival's executive director is Steven Ovitsky.  Marc Neikrug has been artistic director since the late 1990s.

Participating musicians in the festival's history included Yuja Wang, Walter Trampler and Andre-Michel Schub.

Major venues include Lensic Performing Arts Center and St. Francis Auditorium in New Mexico Museum of Art.

A radio series from the festival is broadcast by the WFMT Radio Network.

External links
Santa Fe Chamber Music Festival

References

Music festivals established in 1973
Chamber music festivals
Classical music festivals in the United States
Culture of Santa Fe, New Mexico
Tourist attractions in Santa Fe, New Mexico
Music festivals in New Mexico